Gibraltar Mountain may refer to:
 Gibraltar Mountain (Alberta) in Alberta, Canada
 Gibraltar Mountain (Arizona) in Arizona, USA
 Gibraltar Mountain (Oregon) in Oregon, USA
 Gibraltar Mountain (Washington) in Washington, USA

See also
 Mount Gibraltar
 Gibraltar Range